Rarities/B-Sides is the first compilation album by The Raveonettes, and it was released on 15 December 2011 on 500 CD and 500 double 180 gram LP.

Background
This limited edition collection compiles b-side and rare material spanning Whip It On, Chain Gang of Love, Pretty in Black and Lust Lust Lust. Covers released as b-sides or bonus tracks  are not included; specifically Eddie Cochran's C'mon Everybody, Hank Williams' I'm So Lonesome I Could Cry, and Buddy Holly's Everyday.

Rarities/B-Sides marks the first time the 2003 single The Christmas Song has been available on an album, as the song was absent from the 2008 Christmas EP Wishing You a Rave Christmas. Despite that the song has never been included on an album, Sune Rose Wagner stated "it has since become our biggest selling song ever with appearances in countless movies, commercials, etc."

The album art contains various photographs and a poster by contemporary artist and photographer Todd Hido. Hido previously worked with The Raveonettes when he directed the video for the Raven in the Grave single Apparitions.

Reception
NME'''s Hardeep Phull gave the compilation a positive review stating "Quality control has clearly never been a problem for the Raveonettes. Quantity control on the other hand has been something of on an ongoing nightmare for the Danish duo. Having an embarrassment of riches comes with its own problems but thanks to Rarities/B-Sides, that problem has been emphatically solved."

Track listing

 CD Track 1: Pre The Raveonettes. Tracks 2-7: from Whip It On recording sessions. Tracks 8-10: from Chain Gang Of Love recording sessions. Tracks 12-19: from Pretty In Black recording sessions. Track 20: Written for the Danish movie Nordkraft. Tracks 21-27: from Lust, Lust, Lust'' recording sessions.

References

2011 compilation albums
The Raveonettes albums
Albums produced by Richard Gottehrer
B-side compilation albums